The 2016–17 Ball State Cardinals men's basketball team represented Ball State University during the 2016–17 NCAA Division I men's basketball season. The Cardinals, led by fourth-year head coach James Whitford, played their home games at Worthen Arena as members of the West Division of the Mid-American Conference. They finished the season 21–13, 11–7 in MAC play to finish in a tie for the West Division title. As the No. 4 seed in the MAC tournament they defeated Western Michigan in the quarterfinals to advance to the Semifinals where they lost to Akron. They were invited to the CollegeInsider.com Tournament where they lost in the first round to Fort Wayne.

Previous season
The Cardinals finished the 2015–16 season 21–14, 10–8 in MAC play to finish in a tie for the West Division championship. They lost to Miami (OH) in the first round of the MAC tournament. They were invited to the CollegeInsider.com Tournament where they defeated Tennessee State and UT Martin to advance to the Quarterfinals before losing to Columbia.

Departures

Incoming Transfers

Recruiting class of 2016

Recruiting class of 2017

Roster

Schedule and results

|-
!colspan=9 style=| Exhibition

|-
!colspan=9 style=| Non-conference regular season

|-
!colspan=9 style=| MAC regular season

|-
!colspan=9 style=| MAC tournament

|-
!colspan=9 style=| CIT

See also
 2016–17 Ball State Cardinals women's basketball team

References

Ball State
Ball State
Ball State Cardinals men's basketball seasons
Ball State
Ball State